The 2020 Centane Bus Accident was a road accident in Centane, Eastern Cape, South Africa that occurred on March 2, 2020. 25 people were killed and approximately 62 were injured when a 65-seater bus plunged into a deep gorge. The bus had been travelling from Cebe village heading to Butterworth.

According to witness accounts from the survivors, the bus, which was mainly transporting pensioners and young children and was allegedly overloaded, veered off the gravel road and plunged into a deep gorge, killing 25 people including the driver. The eastern cape transport spokesperson Unathi Binqose said that passengers had complained to the driver about the speed at which he was going. A number of injured passengers were airlifted to nearby hospitals.

The accident sent shockwaves across South Africa. The president of the country Cyril Ramaphosa offered his condolences to families of the victims involved in the accident.

The Minister of Transport also offered his condolences.

Aftermath 
President Cryil Ramaphosa promised to improve the infrastructure in Centane.

On 13 March 2020, a mass burial was held for the victims.

References 

Eastern Cape
2020 in South Africa
Road incidents in South Africa
2020 disasters in South Africa